The Devil's Chains (German: Satansketten) is a 1921 German silent film directed by Léo Lasko and starring Ressel Orla, Margarete Kupfer and Marga von Kierska.

The film's sets were designed by the art director Robert Herlth and Walter Röhrig.

Cast
Ressel Orla
Margarete Kupfer
Marga von Kierska
Alfred Haase
Erich Kaiser-Titz

References

External links

Films of the Weimar Republic
German silent feature films
Films directed by Léo Lasko
German black-and-white films
German drama films
1921 drama films
Terra Film films
Silent drama films
1920s German films
1920s German-language films